Fritzi Brunette (born Florence Brunet; May 27, 1890 – September 28, 1943) was an American actress.

Early years 
Fritzi Brunette was born Florence Brunet in Savannah, Georgia, or in Boston although some sources list her birthname as Florence Simone. She was educated in New York City.

Career
Brunette made her film debut in the 1912 short A Waiter of Weight, followed by The Joy Ride (1912), and His Neighbor's Wife (1912). Brunette appeared in films such as Unto Those Who Sin (1916), in which she played a working girl of squalor, lured by wealth and luxury, The Woman Thou Gavest Me (1919), While Satan Sleeps (1922), Bells of San Juan (1922), and Camille of the Barbary Coast (1925).

In the 1930s and 1940s, Brunette mainly acted in uncredited roles, with her final screen appearance being in You're Telling Me (1942).

Personal life
Brunette was the third wife of William Robert Daly, a silent film actor and director. Daly, who died around 1935, directed Brunette in many films. After Daly's death, she married Louisville, Kentucky, real estate operator John E. Kley.

Death 
Brunette died after an extended illness on September 28, 1943, aged 53.

Filmography

 The Joy Ride (1912) (as Miss Fritzi)
 His Neighbor's Wife (1912) (as Miss Fritzie)
 For the Good of All (1912) (as Miss Fritzie)
 Babies Three (1912)
 Mates and Mis-Mates (1912) .... Mabel Wentworth
 Her Life's Story (1912) .... Lucy Allen
 Dora (1912) .... Mary
 As the Wind Blows (1912) .... The Summer Girl
 Two Women (1912) .... The Wife
 On the Danger Line (1912)
 Was Mabel Cured? (1912)
 It Happened Thus (1912) .... The Younger Daughter
 Foolishness of Oliver (1912)
 The Consequences (1912)
 The Professor's Dilemma (1912)
 The Grouch (1913)
 The Lie (1913)
 The Hypocrite (1913)
 Sunny Smith (1913)
 The Appeal (1913)
 That Boy from Missouri (1913)
 Annie Laurie (1913) .... Annie Laurie
 For the Sins of Another (1913) .... Violet Denton, Philip's Sister
 The Winner (1913)
 For Old Love's Sake (1913)
 The Ring of Sorrow (1913)
 Where the Hop Vine Twines (1913)
 Admission — Two Pins (1914)
 The Militant (1914)
 Forgiven; Or, The Jack of Diamonds (1914) .... Leone Diamond
 The Greater Power (1915)
 The Emigrant's Peril (1915)
 Back of the Shadows (1915)
 Goaded by Jealousy (1915)
 A Skin Game (1915)
 Her Wedding Night (1915)
 A Case of Beans (1915)
 Neath Calvary's Shadows (1915)
 The Price She Paid (1915)
 The Tiger Slayer (1915)
 When California Was Wild (1915)
 The Keeper of the Flock (1915)
 Diamonds Are Trumps (1916)
 Virtue Triumphant (1916)
 The Uncut Diamond (1916)
 Unto Those Who Sin (1916) .... Nadia
 A Serpent in the House (1916)
 At Piney Ridge (1916) .... Cindy Lane
 The Reprisal (1916)
 Out of the Mist (1916)
 Beware of Strangers (1917) .... Bertha Gibson
 The Jaguar's Claws (1917) .... Beth Thomas
 The Golden Bullet (1917)
 Who Shall Take My Life? (1917) .... Kate Taylor
 And a Still Small Voice (1918) .... Mary Singleton
 The City of Purple Dreams (1918) .... Esther Strom
 The Still Alarm (1918) .... Undetermined Role
 Playthings (1918) .... Marjorie North
 The Velvet Hand (1918) .... Gianna Russelli
 The Sealed Envelope (1919) .... Lena
 The Railroader (1919) .... 	Anice Lanier
 Whitewashed Walls (1919) .... Concha
 The Woman Thou Gavest Me (1919) .... Alma
 Jacques of the Silver North (1919) .... Memory Baird
 A Sporting Chance (1919) .... Gilberte Bonheur
 The Woman Under Cover (1919) .... Alma Jordan
 The Lord Loves the Irish (1919) .... Sheila Lynch
 Live Sparks (1920) .... Myrtle Pratt
 The Dream Cheater (1920) .... Pauline Mahon
 Number 99 (1920) .... Cynthia Vivian
 The Green Flame (1920) .... Ruth Gardner
 $30,000 (1920) .... Aline Norton
 The House of Whispers (1920) .... Barbara Bradford
 The Devil to Pay (1920) .... Dare Keeling
 The Coast of Opportunity (1920) .... Janet Ashley
 Tiger True (1921) .... Mary Dover
 The Butterfly Girl (1921) .... Lorna Lear
 A Wife's Awakening (1921) .... Florence Otis
 Discontented Wives (1921) .... Ruth Gaylord
 Sure Fire (1921) .... Elinor Parker
 The Man from Lost River (1921) .... Marcia
 Give Me My Son (1922)
 While Satan Sleeps (1922) .... Salome Deming
 The Crusader (1922) .... Alice
 Bells of San Juan (1922) .... Dorothy Page
 The Boss of Camp 4 (1922) .... Iris Paxton
 The Other Side (1922)
 The Footlight Ranger (1923) .... Janet Ainslee
 Cause for Divorce (1923) .... Laura Parker
 Camille of the Barbary Coast (1925) .... Maggie Smith
 The Pace That Thrills (1925) .... Paula
 The Virgin Wife (1926) .... Mrs. Henry Lattimer
 Driftwood (1928) .... Lola
 Rustlers of Red Dog (1935) .... Saloon girl
 Tailspin Tommy in The Great Air Mystery (1935) (uncredited) .... Dinner Guest [Ch. 1]
 This is the Life (1935) (uncredited)
 San Francisco (1936) (uncredited)
 Maid of Salem (1937) (uncredited) .... Bit Part
 Way Out West (1937) (uncredited) .... Audience at saloon
 Make Way for Tomorrow (1937) (uncredited) .... Bit Role
 Souls at Sea (1937) (uncredited) .... Bit Role
 Wells Fargo (1937) (uncredited) .... Pioneer Woman
 Disbarred (1939) (uncredited) .... Maid
 Persons in Hiding (1939) (uncredited) .... Automobile Passenger
 Stagecoach (1939) (uncredited) .... Bit part
 The Star Maker (1939) (uncredited)
 Honeymoon in Bali (1939) .... Secretary
 $1000 a Touchdown (1939) (uncredited) .... McGlen Wife
 Edison, the Man (1940) (uncredited)
 Meet John Doe (1941) (uncredited) .... Bit part
 You're Telling Me (1942) (uncredited)

References

Fort Wayne, Indiana Journal-Gazette, Jack O' Diamonds Best On The Card, Tuesday Morning, May 12, 1914, Page 13.
Lima, Ohio Times-Democrat, Fritzi Brunette Makes Debut Soon, Thursday Evening, March 2, 1916, Page 7.
The Los Angeles Times, Fritzi Brunette, September 30, 1943, Page A12.

External links

1890 births
1943 deaths
American silent film actresses
American film actresses
Actresses from Georgia (U.S. state)
Actors from Savannah, Georgia
20th-century American actresses